The 2018 Betway World Cup of Darts was the eighth edition of the PDC World Cup of Darts. It took place between 31 May–3 June 2018 in at the Eissporthalle in Frankfurt, Germany.

The Netherlands pairing of Michael van Gerwen and Raymond van Barneveld were the reigning champions and they retained the title by defeating Scotland's Peter Wright and Gary Anderson 3–1 in the final.

Format
The tournament will remain at 32 teams this year, with the top 8 teams being seeded and the remaining 24 teams being unseeded in the first round. Like last year, there are no groups in 2018 with the tournament being a straight knockout.

First round: Best of nine legs doubles.
Second round, quarter and semi-finals: Two best of seven legs singles matches. If the scores are tied a best of seven legs doubles match will settle the match.
Final: Three points needed to win the title. Two best of seven legs singles matches are played followed by a best of seven doubles match. If necessary, one or two best of seven legs singles matches in reverse order are played to determine the champion.

Prize money
Total prize money remained at £300,000, like last year. The prize money will be per team:

Teams and seedings

The Top 8 nations based on combined Order of Merit rankings on 14 May were seeded. 

Seeded nations

Unseeded nations (in alphabetical order)

Results

Draw

Second round
Two best of seven legs singles matches. If the scores were tied, a best of seven legs doubles match settled the match.

Quarter-finals
Two best of seven legs singles matches. If the scores were tied, a best of seven legs doubles match will settle the match.

Semi-finals
Two best of seven legs singles matches. If the scores were tied, a best of seven legs doubles match will settle the match.

Final
Three match wins were needed to win the title. Two best of seven legs singles matches followed by a best of seven doubles match. If necessary, one or two best of seven legs reverse singles matches are played to determine the champion.

References

2018
World Cup
PDC World Cup of Darts
Sports competitions in Frankfurt
PDC World Cup of Darts
PDC World Cup of Darts